The A1078 is an English A road entirely in the county of Norfolk. It runs from a junction with the A148 King's Lynn to Cromer Road in the town of King's Lynn to a junction with the A148 King's Lynn to Cromer in the northern suburbs of King's Lynn. The road is an essential part of the transport infrastructure of King's Lynn as it links King's Lynn Docks and its industrial estates to the A149 Queen Elizabeth Way (King's Lynn Southern Bypass), allowing HGV traffic to reach the A47 main trunk road without passing through the centre of King's Lynn.

References

Roads in England
Transport in Norfolk